Mudapilavu temple is a well known Vishnu temple in the Chiyyaram region, Thrissur district, Kerala state,  India. It is situated near the Vakayil Road.  It is well known for its nostalgic atmosphere.

See also
 Temples of Kerala

Vishnu temples
Hindu temples in Thrissur district